Charles Ball (1780–?) was a fugitive slave and soldier in the War of 1812.

Charles Ball may also refer to:

Charles Ball (politician) (1819–1903), California politician, president of the Chico Board of Trustees, jeweler and watchmaker
Charles Bent Ball (1851–1916), Irish surgeon
Charles Richard Ball (1833–1918), Anglican priest
Charles Clyde Ball (1881–1955), American football and basketball player and coach
C. Olin Ball (1893–1970), American food scientist
Sir Charles Arthur Kinahan Ball, 2nd Baronet (1877–1945) of the Ball baronets
Sir Charles Irwin Ball, 4th Baronet (1924–2002) of the Ball baronets

See also
Ball (surname)